Ifri n'Ammar is an Aterian, Iberomaurusian, and Mediterranean Neolithic archaeological site in Morocco located on in the Oriental Rif commune of Afsou, about 50 km south of the city of Nador.

See also
Iberomaurusian
Cardium
Mechta-Afalou
Taforalt

References

 
 
 
 

Archaeological sites in Morocco